Speed Zone (also known as Cannonball Fever and Cannonball Run III) is a 1989 American action comedy film set around an illegal cross-country race (inspired by the Cannonball Baker Sea-To-Shining-Sea Memorial Trophy Dash). The plot follows the race sponsors, who must line up new contestants after the previous racers are all arrested before the race begins.

The film stars four alumni of SCTV: John Candy, Eugene Levy, Joe Flaherty and Don Lake. The cast also includes Donna Dixon, Matt Frewer, Tim Matheson, Mimi Kuzyk, Melody Anderson, Shari Belafonte, Dick and Tom Smothers, Peter Boyle, Alyssa Milano, John Schneider, Brooke Shields, Michael Spinks, Lee Van Cleef, Harvey Atkin, Brian George, Art Hindle, Louis Del Grande, Carl Lewis and Richard Petty.

Plot
An assortment of people gather at a countryside inn in preparation for the infamous "Cannonball Run," an illegal three-day cross-country race from Washington, D.C. to Santa Monica where the winner and five runners-up will receive $1 million. However, the hot-headed Washington Chief of Police, Spiro T. Edsel, along with his long-suffering sidekick Whitman, arrest all of the drivers to prevent the race from happening. As a result, sponsors must find replacement drivers by the next day.

Leo Ross, seeing that his old school rival, Charlie Cronan, has driving skills while working as a parking valet, bullies him into driving his BMW. Ross also persuades Charlie to bring along Tiffany, a dimwitted Marilyn Monroe-esque actress.

Vic DeRubis is a hitman-for-hire sent to kill Alec Stewart, an English deadbeat and compulsive gambler who has squandered money that he borrowed from a loan shark, Big Wally. Alec convinces Vic to ride with him, hoping to win the Cannonball Run and pay off Big Wally. They team up in a Jaguar XJS.

Lea Roberts and Margaret take over a Ferrari Daytona Spyder by trapping Ferrari representative Gus Gold in the car, stunt-driving it, and refusing to let him out until he agrees to let them drive it in the race. MIT graduates into electronics and gadgets, they are tempted by the prize money and the challenge.

When the driver of the Lamborghini is arrested, a skittish Italian mechanic, Valentino Rosatti, is forced to drive it, but Flash, a former policeman who wants the money for his own reasons, takes the wheel.

Nelson and Randolph Van Sloan, two millionaires and the only drivers not arrested in the police sweep, enter in a Bentley Corniche convertible. They spend most of their time trying to secretly catch a flight to Los Angeles in order to win by cheating. However, the plane is hijacked during take off and the hijacker is subdued by the pilots, resulting in the plane overshooting the runway and going on to the highway.

Following the race are a pair of television reporters, Heather Scott and Jack O'Neill, who get so caught up in the action that they decide to race their Ford news van.

In hot pursuit is Edsel, who grows increasingly insane in his unsuccessful efforts to stop the racers. Edsel and his men manage to arrest Vic and Alec, who quickly escape and steal the police car. Edsel and Whitman chase after them in their Jaguar.

At the race conclusion, Edsel and Whitman themselves win the Cannonball Run by driving the Jaguar across the finish line at Santa Monica Pier first--saving Alec, because as he points out to Vic; the winner is the car, not the driver--followed by Vic and Alec in their stolen police car. Charlie and Tiffany driving the BMW finish third, Lee and Margaret fourth, Heather and Jack fifth, Flash and Valentino sixth, with the Van Sloan brothers coming in last while riding on roller skis.

The ending credits features the cast playfully driving bumper cars.

Cast
 Melody Anderson as Lea Roberts
 Harvey Atkin as Gus Gold
 Shari Belafonte as Margaret
 Peter Boyle as Metro Police Chief Spiro T. Edsel
 John Candy as Charlie Cronan
 Louis Del Grande as Mr. Benson
 Donna Dixon as Tiffany
 Jamie Farr as The Sheik
 Joe Flaherty as Vic DeRubis
 Matt Frewer as Alec Stewart
 Brian George as Valentino Rosatti
 Art Hindle as "Flash"
 Mimi Kuzyk as Heather Scott
 Don Lake as Whitman
 Eugene Levy as Leo Ross
 Carl Lewis as Jogger / Himself
 Tim Matheson as Jack O'Neill
 Alyssa Milano as Lurleen
 Richard Petty (uncredited) as himself
 Brooke Shields as Stewardess / Herself
 Dick Smothers as Nelson Van Sloan
 Tom Smothers as Randolph Van Sloan
 Michael Spinks as Bachelor / Himself

Jamie Farr cameos as "Sheik Abdul Ben Falafel", who says in an interview that he is retiring from racing. Farr and his character are the only actor and character to appear in all three films of the Cannonball Run universe.

John Schneider makes a cameo as Cannonballer #1, the driver of the Lamborghini Countach in the opening scene while being chased by an assortment of police cars, and is seen wearing an orange racing suit with a Confederate flag on it, a nod to The Dukes of Hazzard character Schneider played.

Lee Van Cleef, in one of his final appearances, is in the same scene playing an old man teaching his grandson how to skip stones on a pond as the Lamborghini drives past.

Reception
The film received negative reviews from critics and was nominated for three Golden Raspberry Awards including Worst Picture and Worst Director, with Brooke Shields winning Worst Supporting Actress. The very brief cameo by Shields has her playing herself, saying that she hopes not to end up "doing bit parts in movies". Chicago film critic Roger Ebert gave the film zero stars in his review for the Chicago Sun-Times:

Ebert's colleague Gene Siskel also gave a harsh review to this film--he said "it is an atrocious excuse for entertainment. If I have a pet peeve about movies is that they are so venal that don't even try to be good. That's Speed Zone".

Audiences polled by CinemaScore gave the film an average grade of "D+" on an A+ to F scale.

Home media

The film was released in North America on VHS in 1990 by Media Home Entertainment. It was also issued on laserdisc by Image Entertainment (#ID7192ME) for American and Canadian markets in 1990. In Japan, the film was released on laserdisc by Towa-Pioneer and packaged as The Cannonball Run III: Speed Zone. The Japanese disc release did not feature an on-screen credit "The Cannonball Run III", but carried the same "Speed Zone" on-screen credit as found in the North American release.

References

External links

 
 
 
 

1980s comedy road movies
1989 action comedy films
1989 films
American action comedy films
American auto racing films
Canadian action comedy films
Canadian auto racing films
Canadian comedy road movies
Films directed by Jim Drake (director)
Orion Pictures films
Golden Raspberry Award winning films
1980s English-language films
1980s American films
1980s Canadian films